Brian Kincher (born August 16, 1986) is an American male acrobatic gymnast. With Eirian Smith, he competed in the 2014 Acrobatic Gymnastics World Championships.

References 

1986 births
Living people
American acrobatic gymnasts
Male acrobatic gymnasts
21st-century American people